Hans Kristian Seip (30 June 1920 – 8 October 2012) was a Norwegian forester.

He was born in Molde. He was a professor at the Norwegian College of Agriculture from 1955 to 1966, State Secretary in the Norwegian Ministry of Agriculture from 1966 to 1967 and director in the same ministry from 1967 to 1983. He was a member of the Royal Swedish Academy of Agriculture and Forestry.

References

1920 births
2012 in Norway
People from Molde
Hans Kristian
Norwegian foresters
Forestry academics
Academic staff of the Norwegian College of Agriculture
Norwegian state secretaries
Liberal Party (Norway) politicians
Norwegian civil servants
Members of the Royal Swedish Academy of Agriculture and Forestry
2012 deaths